A Window in Piccadilly is a 1928 British silent romance film directed by Sidney Morgan and starring Joan Morgan, John F. Hamilton and James Carew. It was made at Twickenham Studios as an independent production by Sidney Morgan.

Cast
 Joan Morgan as The Girl  
 John F. Hamilton as Piccolo  
 James Carew as The Father  
 Julie Suedo as Sally  
 Maurice Braddell as Harry  
 Edmund Willard as The Fourth Party  
 DeGroot as The Professor

References

Bibliography
 Low, Rachael. History of the British Film, 1918-1929. George Allen & Unwin, 1971.
 Wood, Linda. British Films 1927-1939. British Film Institute, 1986.

External links

1928 films
1920s romance films
British romance films
Films directed by Sidney Morgan
British silent feature films
Films shot at Twickenham Film Studios
Films set in London
British black-and-white films
1920s English-language films
1920s British films